Xanthophyllum ovatifolium is a tree in the family Polygalaceae. The specific epithet  is from the Latin meaning "egg-shaped leaf".

Description
Xanthophyllum ovatifolium has unbranched inflorescences bearing four to six flowers. The flowers are white, drying pale brownish.

Distribution and habitat
Xanthophyllum ovatifolium grows naturally in Borneo where it is confined to Sarawak. It may also grow in Sumatra but is considered unlikely there.

References

ovatifolium
Trees of Sumatra
Trees of Borneo
Flora of Sarawak
Plants described in 1896